Elisabeth of Bavaria (Elisabeth Gabriele Valérie Marie; 25 July 187623 November 1965) was Queen of the Belgians from 23 December 1909 to 17 February 1934 as the wife of King Albert I, and a duchess in Bavaria by birth. She was the mother of King Leopold III of Belgium and of Queen Marie-José of Italy, and grandmother of kings Baudouin and Albert II of Belgium, and Grand Duchess Joséphine-Charlotte of Luxembourg.

Family

Born in Possenhofen Castle, her father was Duke Karl Theodor in Bavaria, head of a cadet branch of the Bavarian royal family, and an ophthalmologist. She was named after her paternal aunt, Empress Elisabeth of Austria, better known as Sisi. Her mother was Infanta Maria José of Portugal, daughter of exiled Miguel I of Portugal. Charlotte, Grand Duchess of Luxembourg, Empress Zita, the last Empress of Austria and Queen of Hungary, and Prince Felix of Bourbon-Parma, husband of Grand Duchess Charlotte and brother of Empress Zita, were among Elisabeth's first cousins.

An artist himself, Duke Karl-Theodor cultivated the artistic tastes of his family and Elisabeth was raised with a deep love for painting, music and sculpture. At her father's clinic, where her mother assisted her father as a nurse, Elisabeth obtained exposure to productive labor and to human suffering unusual at that time for a princess.

Married life and queenship

In Munich on 2 October 1900, Duchess Elisabeth married Prince Albert I, second-in-line to the throne of Belgium (after his father Prince Philippe, Count of Flanders). Upon her husband's accession to the Belgian throne in 1909, Elisabeth became queen. The Congolese city of Élisabethville, today Lubumbashi, was named in her honor.

They first met in 1897 at the funeral of Elisabeth's aunt Duchess Sophie Charlotte in Bavaria, who was also the mother-in-law of Albert's sister Henriette. At the time, Prince Albert was the heir to his uncle Leopold II of Belgium. Albert was the second son of Prince Philippe, Count of Flanders, and Princess Marie of Hohenzollern-Sigmaringen, a sister of King Carol I of Romania.

At birth, Albert occupied the third place in the line of succession behind his father and elder brother, Prince Baudouin. The unexpected death of Baudouin in January 1891 immediately raised Albert to prominence within his country. A studious, quiet man, Albert was not the choice of heir that King Leopold II would have relished. As the only living male member of his generation, Albert was guaranteed the Crown of the Belgians upon the King's death. Albert had two sisters who survived into adulthood, Princess Henriette who married Prince Emmanuel of Orléans, and Princess Joséphine Caroline who married her cousin, Prince Karl-Anton of Hohenzollern-Sigmaringen, brother of King Ferdinand I of Romania.

In December 1909, Albert and Elisabeth became King and Queen of the Belgians, following the death of Albert's uncle, King Leopold II. The new Queen took on a much more public role than her predecessors, getting involved with many charities and organizations, particularly those in the arts and social welfare. She often surrounded herself with famous authors and artists, as well as leading scientists of the day. Her friendly nature, and true care and concern for others, quickly endeared her to the people of Belgium.

When war broke out in 1914, Queen Elisabeth worked with the nurses on the front and helped establish the Symphony Orchestra of the field army. By the end of 1914, she gave Belgian King's Messenger Archibald A. Gordon alias Major Gordon the task to participate in the establishment of the Hospital L'Océan in La Panne. The Queen traveled frequently to the United Kingdom, under the pretext of visiting her children who were studying there. She was often bringing important messages and information to the British government from her husband and his forces. Following the war, the family made a triumphant return to Brussels and set about to rebuild the nation.

During the First World War, she and the King resided in De Panne. The Queen made herself beloved by visiting the front lines and by sponsoring a nursing unit. Despite her German background, she was a popular queen, perceived as eagerly supporting her adoptive country.

From 23 September to 13 November 1919, the Queen, together with the King and Prince Leopold, undertook an official visit to the United States of America. During a journey in the historic pueblo of Isleta in New Mexico, the King awarded the Order of Leopold to Father Anton Docher. As a memento, the King was given a turquoise cross mounted in silver made by the Tiwa people. Ten thousand people traveled to Isleta for the occasion.

Later years

On 17 February 1934, Albert I died in a mountain climbing accident in the Ardennes of Belgium, near Namur. He was succeeded by their elder son, King Leopold III. Elisabeth withdrew from public life, so as not to hinder the efforts of her daughter-in-law, now Queen Astrid. However, in August 1935, Queen Astrid was killed in a car crash in Küssnacht am Rigi, Switzerland.  Queen Elisabeth returned to the public life, doing her best to support her son and his family, and resuming her position as first lady of the land.

Elisabeth lived to see her son become king (but also go into exile and abdicate), her younger son become, effectively, regent of the realm, and her grandson mount the throne.

As queen dowager, she became a patron of the arts and was known for her friendship with such notable scientists as Albert Einstein. During the German occupation of Belgium from 1940 to 1944, she used her influence as queen and her German connections to assist in the rescue of hundreds of Jewish children from deportation by the Nazis. When Brussels was liberated, she allowed her palace to be used for headquarters of the British XXX Corps, and presented its commander General Horrocks with its mascot, a young wild boar named 'Chewing Gum'. After the war she was awarded the title Righteous Among the Nations by the Israeli government.

During the 1950s, the Queen evoked controversy abroad by visiting the Soviet Union, China and Poland, trips that prompted some to label her as the "Red Queen". She became the first royal to pay a royal visit to Israel in 1959.

Queen Elisabeth died in Brussels at the age of 89 on 23 November 1965 from a heart attack. She is interred in the royal vault at the Church of Our Lady of Laeken, Brussels. She was the 1,016th Dame of the Royal Order of Queen Maria Luisa.

Legacy
The city of Lubumbashi in Congo (Kinshasa) was formerly known as "Élisabethville", and it was named in her honor when it was founded in 1910 in what was then the Belgian Congo. It adopted its current name in 1966 when, after six years of wrangling following independence, Belgium removed colonial names under the leadership of Joseph Desire Mobutu .

The Queen Elisabeth Competition, a longstanding international competition for career-starting classical musicians regularly held in Brussels, is named after her.

Belgian Egyptologist Jean Capart created the Fondation Égyptologique Reine Élisabeth in honor of her visit to Tutankhamun's tomb on 18 February 1923. The association is now called Association Égyptologique Reine Élisabeth.

Children
 King Leopold III of Belgium, born 3 November 1901, and died at Woluwe-Saint-Lambert on 25 September 1983.
 Prince Charles, Count of Flanders, born Brussels 10 October 1903, and died at Ostend on 1 June 1983.
Marie-José, Queen of Italy, born Ostend 4 August 1906, and died in Thonex, Switzerland, on 27 January 2001.

Honours

National
  Bavarian Royal Family: Dame of the Royal Order of Saint Elizabeth, 1st Class
 : Grand Cordon of the Order of Leopold

Foreign
  Austrian Imperial Family: Grand Cross of the Imperial Austrian Order of Elizabeth, 1910
 : Grand Cross of the National Order of the Legion of Honour, 14 November 1918
 : Grand Cordon of the Order of the Precious Crown
 : Dame of the Order of the Gold Lion of the House of Nassau
 :
 Grand Cross of the Order of the Netherlands Lion
 Queen Juliana Inauguration Medal
 :
 Dame of the Order of the White Eagle
 Cross of Valour Medal, 1922
  Romanian Royal Family: Honorary Grand Cross of the Order of Carol I
  Spanish Royal Family: Dame of the Order of Queen Maria Luisa, 24 June 1910
 : Member of the Decoration of the Royal Red Cross
  Holy See: Dame of the Decoration of Honour

 Awards
 : Righteous Among the Nations

Arms

Ancestry

See also
Queen Elisabeth Competition
Queen Elisabeth Medical Foundation

References

External links

 
 

	

1876 births
1965 deaths
House of Wittelsbach
German princesses
German duchesses
Duchesses in Bavaria
House of Saxe-Coburg and Gotha (Belgium)
Belgian queens consort
Grand Croix of the Légion d'honneur
Grand Cordons of the Order of the Precious Crown
Recipients of the Order of the Netherlands Lion
Recipients of the Cross of Valour (Poland)
Members of the Royal Red Cross
People from Starnberg (district)
German Roman Catholics
Belgian Roman Catholics
Belgian Righteous Among the Nations
Catholic Righteous Among the Nations
Burials at the Church of Our Lady of Laeken
Members of the Royal Academy of Belgium
Recipients of the Order of the White Eagle (Poland)
Queen mothers